Mell (stylized as MELL) is a female Japanese singer from Sapporo, Japan, who is signed to Geneon Universal Entertainment. She is a former member of the Sapporo-based I've Sound, and one of its main vocalists. Mell has contributed vocals to several anime soundtracks including Black Lagoon, Hayate the Combat Butler, Rideback, Shakugan no Shana,  and Sky Girls.

After battling an unknown illness over a prolonged period, Mell left I've Sound after the release of her compilation album Entrust: The Name of Mell on March 20, 2013.

Discography

Albums

Singles

DVDs 
Mell First Live Tour 2008 Scope DVD
Released on April 29, 2009

 Under Superstition
 Way beyond there
 Kill
 No vain
 On my own
 Permit
 Proof
 Kicks!
 Scope
 Red fraction
 The first finale in me
 Egen
 Virgin's high!

Song list

I've solo works 
  (February 5, 1999)
 "Fall in Love" (September 24, 1999)
  (October 16, 1999)
 "Repeat" (October 16, 1999)
 "Fly to the Top" (July 16, 2000)
  (December 8, 2000)
  (December 22, 2000)
  (January 26, 2001)
  -comment te dire adieu- (March 2, 2001)
 "World My Eyes -prototype-" (December 28, 2002)
  (December 28, 2002)
 "Last in Blue" (February 28, 2003)
 "Spiral" (June 27, 2003)
 "Out Flow" (September 5, 2003)
 "Our Youthful Days" (October 31, 2003)
 "Permit" (December 17, 2004)
 "Permit" -Unplugged mix- (December 17, 2004)
 "Permit" -- (December 17, 2004)
 "Permit" -- Unplugged Mix (December 17, 2004)
  (Mixed up ver.) (December 29, 2004)
 "Egen" (January 14, 2005)
 "Two face (Front Line Covers ver.)" (December 28, 2008)
 "Disintegration (Front Line Covers ver.)" (December 28, 2008)
  (March 25, 2009)
 "Bizarrerie Cage" (May 1, 2009)
 "Noblest Love" (February 26, 2010)

Mell and Miki 
  (July 14, 2000)

Kotoko and Mell 
 "See You"  (June 14, 2006)

I've Special Unit 
 "See You"  (P.V ver.) (September 5, 2003)
 "Fair Heaven" (July 30, 2005)
 ; performed as Love Planet Five (April 4, 2007)

Solo 
 "Dear memories"
 "The Winner Takes It All"
 "Hello Goodbye" (Silent Half)
 "Mermaid"
 "Split" (...Split)
 "Video-Killed-The-Radio-Star"
 
 "Strange Woman"
 "Noyau"
 "Mermaid in the City"
 "Fin"
 "Where Are You Now?"

Orihime 
 
 
 "Love Generation"

Aki & Kotoko & Mell & Naraku & Yokko-Q

C.G Mix featuring Mell 
 "Detect"

References

External links 
  
  

Anime musicians
I've Sound members
Japanese women singers
Musicians from Sapporo
NBCUniversal Entertainment Japan artists
Hayate the Combat Butler
Living people
Year of birth missing (living people)